Kuntur Ikiña (Aymara kunturi condor, ikiña to sleep, Hispanicized spelling Condoriqueña) is a mountain in the Andes of Peru, about  high. It is located in the Puno Region, Lampa Province, Lampa District.

References

Mountains of Puno Region
Mountains of Peru